Thermochromism is the property of substances to change color due to a change in temperature.  A mood ring is an excellent example of this phenomenon, but thermochromism also has more practical uses, such as baby bottles which change to a different color when cool enough to drink, or kettles which change color when water is at or near boiling point.  Thermochromism is one of several types of chromism.

Organic materials

Thermochromatic liquid crystals

The two common approaches are based on liquid crystals and leuco dyes. Liquid crystals are used in precision applications, as their responses can be engineered to accurate temperatures, but their color range is limited by their principle of operation. Leuco dyes allow wider range of colors to be used, but their response temperatures are more difficult to set with accuracy.

Some liquid crystals are capable of displaying different colors at different temperatures. This change is dependent on selective reflection of certain wavelengths by the crystallic structure of the material, as it changes between the low-temperature crystallic phase, through anisotropic chiral or twisted nematic phase, to the high-temperature isotropic liquid phase. Only the nematic mesophase has thermochromic properties; this restricts the effective temperature range of the material.

The twisted nematic phase has the molecules oriented in layers with regularly changing orientation, which gives them periodic spacing. The light passing through the crystal undergoes Bragg diffraction on these layers, and the wavelength with the greatest constructive interference is reflected back, which is perceived as a spectral color.  A change in the crystal temperature can result in a change of spacing between the layers and therefore in the reflected wavelength.  The color of the thermochromic liquid crystal can therefore continuously range from non-reflective (black) through the spectral colors to black again, depending on the temperature.  Typically, the high temperature state will reflect blue-violet, while the low-temperature state will reflect red-orange.  Since blue is a shorter wavelength than red, this indicates that the distance of layer spacing is reduced by heating through the liquid-crystal state.

Some such materials are cholesteryl nonanoate or cyanobiphenyls.

Mixtures with 3–5 °C span of temperatures and ranges from about 17–23 °C to about 37–40 °C can be composed from varying proportions of cholesteryl oleyl carbonate, cholesteryl nonanoate, and cholesteryl benzoate. For example, the mass ratio of 65:25:10 yields range of 17–23 °C, and 30:60:10 yields range of 37–40 °C.

Liquid crystals used in dyes and inks often come microencapsulated, in the form of suspension.

Liquid crystals are used in applications where the color change has to be accurately defined. They find applications in thermometers for room, refrigerator, aquarium, and medical use, and in indicators of level of propane in tanks. A popular application for thermochromic liquid crystals are the mood rings.

Liquid crystals are difficult to work with and require specialized printing equipment. The material itself is also typically more expensive than alternative technologies. High temperatures, ultraviolet radiation, some chemicals and/or solvents have a negative impact on their lifespan.

Leuco dyes

Thermochromic dyes are based on mixtures of leuco dyes with other suitable chemicals, displaying a color change (usually between the colorless leuco form and the colored form) that depends upon temperature. The dyes are rarely applied on materials directly; they are usually in the form of microcapsules with the mixture sealed inside. An illustrative example is the Hypercolor fashion, where microcapsules with crystal violet lactone, weak acid, and a dissociable salt dissolved in dodecanol are applied to the fabric; when the solvent is solid, the dye exists in its lactone leuco form, while when the solvent melts, the salt dissociates, the pH inside the microcapsule lowers, the dye becomes protonated, its lactone ring opens, and its absorption spectrum shifts drastically, therefore it becomes deeply violet. In this case the apparent thermochromism is in fact halochromism.

The dyes most commonly used are spirolactones, fluorans, spiropyrans, and fulgides. The acids include bisphenol A, parabens, 1,2,3-triazole derivates, and 4-hydroxycoumarin and act as proton donors, changing the dye molecule between its leuco form and its protonated colored form; stronger acids would make the change irreversible.

Leuco dyes have less accurate temperature response than liquid crystals. They are suitable for general indicators of approximate temperature ("too cool", "too hot", "about OK"), or for various novelty items. They are usually used in combination with some other pigment, producing a color change between the color of the base pigment and the color of the pigment combined with the color of the non-leuco form of the leuco dye. The color change usually happens in a 3 °C (5.4 °F) interval.

Leuco dyes are used in applications where temperature response accuracy is not critical: e.g. novelties, bath toys, flying discs, and approximate temperature indicators for microwave-heated foods. Microencapsulation allows their use in wide range of materials and products. The size of the microcapsules typically ranges between 3–5 µm (over 10 times larger than regular pigment particles), which requires some adjustments to printing and manufacturing processes.

An application of leuco dyes is in the Duracell battery state indicators. A layer of a leuco dye is applied on a resistive strip to indicate its heating, thus gauging the amount of current the battery is able to supply. The strip is triangular-shaped, changing its resistance along its length, therefore heating up a proportionally long segment with the amount of current flowing through it. The length of the segment above the threshold temperature for the leuco dye then becomes colored.

Exposure to ultraviolet radiation, solvents and high temperatures reduce the lifespan of leuco dyes.

Thermochromic paints use liquid crystals or leuco dye technology.  After absorbing a certain amount of light or heat, the crystallic or molecular structure of the pigment reversibly changes in such a way that it absorbs and emits light at a different wavelength than at lower temperatures.  Thermochromic paints are seen quite often as a coating on coffee mugs, whereby once hot coffee is poured into the mugs, the thermochromic paint absorbs the heat and becomes colored or transparent, therefore changing the appearance of the mug. These are known as magic mugs or heat changing mugs. Another common example is the use of leuco dye in spoons used in ice cream parlors and frozen yogurt shops. Once dipped into the cold desserts, part of the spoon appears to change color.

Papers
Thermochromic papers are used for thermal printers. One example is the paper impregnated with the solid mixture of a fluoran dye with octadecylphosphonic acid. This mixture is stable in solid phase; however, when the octadecylphosphonic acid is melted, the dye undergoes a chemical reaction in the liquid phase, and assumes the protonated colored form. This state is then conserved when the matrix solidifies again, if the cooling process is fast enough. As the leuco form is more stable in lower temperatures and solid phase, the records on thermochromic papers slowly fade out over years.

Polymers
Thermochromism can appear in thermoplastics, duroplastics, gels or any kind of coatings. The polymer itself, an embedded thermochromic additive or a high ordered structure built by the interaction of the polymer with an incorporated non-thermochromic additive can be the origin of the thermochromic effect. Furthermore, from the physical point of view, the origin of the thermochromic effect can be multifarious. So it can come from changes of light reflection, absorption and/or scattering properties with temperature. The application of thermochromic polymers for adaptive solar protection is of great interest. A function by design strategy, e.g. applied for the development of non-toxic thermochromic polymers has come into the focus in the last decade.

Inks

Thermochromic inks or dyes are temperature sensitive compounds, developed in the 1970s, that temporarily change color with exposure to heat. They come in two forms, liquid crystals and leuco dyes. Leuco dyes are easier to work with and allow for a greater range of applications. These applications include: flat thermometers, battery testers, clothing, and the indicator on bottles of maple syrup that change color when the syrup is warm. The thermometers are often used on the exterior of aquariums, or to obtain a body temperature via the forehead. Coors Light uses thermochromic ink on its cans now, changing from white to blue to indicate the can is cold.

Inorganic materials
Virtually all inorganic compounds are thermochromic to some extent.   Most examples however involve only subtle changes in color.  For example, titanium dioxide, zinc sulfide and zinc oxide are white at room temperature but when heated change to yellow.  Similarly indium(III) oxide is yellow and darkens to yellow-brown when heated.  Lead(II) oxide exhibits a similar color change on heating. The color change is linked to changes in the electronic properties (energy levels, populations) of these materials.

More dramatic examples of thermochromism are found in materials that undergo phase transition or exhibit charge-transfer bands near the visible region.  Examples include
 Cuprous mercury iodide (Cu2[HgI4]) undergoes a phase transition at 67 °C, reversibly changing from a bright red solid material at low temperature to a dark brown solid at high temperature, with intermediate red-purple states. The colors are intense and seem to be caused by Cu(I)–Hg(II) charge-transfer complexes.
 Silver mercury iodide (Ag2[HgI4]) is yellow at low temperatures and orange above 47–51 °C, with intermediate yellow-orange states. The colors are intense and seem to be caused by Ag(I)–Hg(II) charge-transfer complexes.
 Mercury(II) iodide is a crystalline material which at 126 °C undergoes reversible phase transition from red alpha phase to pale yellow beta phase.
 Bis(dimethylammonium) tetrachloronickelate(II) ([(CH3)2NH2]2NiCl4) is a raspberry-red compound, which becomes blue at about 110 °C. On cooling, the compound becomes a light yellow metastable phase, which over 2–3 weeks turns back into original red. Many other tetrachloronickelates are also thermochromic.
 Bis(diethylammonium) tetrachlorocuprate(II) ([(CH3CH2)2NH2]2CuCl4) is a bright green solid material, which at 52–53 °C reversibly changes color to yellow. The color change is caused by relaxation of the hydrogen bonds and subsequent change of geometry of the copper-chlorine complex from planar to deformed tetrahedral, with appropriate change of arrangement of the copper atom's d-orbitals. There is no stable intermediate, the crystals are either green or yellow.
 Chromium(III) oxide and aluminium(III) oxide in a 1:9 ratio is red at room temperature and grey at 400 °C, due to changes in its crystal field.
 Vanadium dioxide has been investigated for use as a "spectrally-selective" window coating to block infrared transmission and reduce the loss of building interior heat through windows.  This material behaves like a semiconductor at lower temperatures, allowing more transmission, and like a conductor at higher temperatures, providing much greater reflectivity. The phase change between transparent semiconductive and reflective conductive phase occurs at 68 °C; doping the material with 1.9% of tungsten lowers the transition temperature to 29 °C.

Other thermochromic solid semiconductor materials include
 CdxZn1−xSySe1−y (x = 0.5–1, y = 0.5–1),
 ZnxCdyHg1−x−yOaSbSecTe1−a−b−c (x = 0–0.5, y = 0.5–1, a = 0–0.5, b = 0.5–1, c = 0–0.5),
 HgxCdyZn1−x−ySbSe1−b (x = 0–1, y = 0–1, b = 0.5–1).

Some minerals are thermochromic as well; for example some chromium-rich pyropes, normally reddish-purplish, become green when heated to about 80 °C.

Irreversible inorganic thermochromes
Some materials change color irreversibly. These can be used for e.g. laser marking of materials.
 Copper(I) iodide is a solid pale tan material transforming at 60–62 °C to orange color.
 Ammonium metavanadate is a white material, turning to brown at 150 °C and then to black at 170 °C.
 Manganese violet (Mn(NH4)2P2O7) is a violet material, a popular pigment, turning to white at 400 °C.

References

 
Inks
Chromism